Andrew Gerle is an American composer and pianist known for his musical adaptation of "Meet John Doe" with librettist Eddie Sugarman which premiered at the Ford's Theater in Washington.  He is the recipient of four Richard Rodgers Awards administered by the American Academy of Arts and Letters and a Jonathan Larson Grant.  His opera "The Beach", a collaboration with librettist Royce Vavrek was presented on May 14, 2011 as part of New York City Opera's VOX Contemporary American Opera Lab.

Biography
The son of classical recording artists Marilyn Neeley and Robert Gerle, Andrew started his musical career as a classical pianist in the Baltimore area, appearing with local orchestras and on National Public Radio and Television. While attending Yale University, he won the Yale Symphony’s concerto competition and the National Symphony Orchestra’s Young Artists’ Competition, and appeared as guest soloist with both orchestras. During this time, he was also invited to participate in a private competition for Maestro Mstislav Rostropovich at the Kennedy Center.

After graduating magna cum laude from Yale, he moved to New York City and began work as a musical director and accompanist. Over the years, he has worked with such distinguished artists as Kitty Carlisle Hart, John Raitt, Leslie Uggams, Jennifer Holliday, Brian Stokes Mitchell, Michael Rupert, and Liz Callaway. He was selected by the Rodgers and Hammerstein Organization to create a complete re-orchestration of South Pacific for a major regional production, and has worked on projects for composers including John Kander, Ricky Ian Gordon, Scott Frankel and Michael Korie.

As a musical theater composer, he is a three-time recipient of the Richard Rodgers Award for new musical writing, administered by Stephen Sondheim and the American Academy of Arts and Letters, for The Tutor (book and lyrics by Maryrose Wood), and recently won his fourth for his original musical, Gloryana. He won a 2006 Jonathan Larson Award from the American Theatre Wing for Meet John Doe (lyrics by Eddie Sugarman), which had its world premiere production at the Ford’s Theatre in Washington, D.C. in 2007 and was nominated for seven Helen Hayes Awards. He was also the first recipient of the Burton Lane Fellowship for Young Composers, awarded by the Theater Hall of Fame. His songs have been performed on Public Radio International, at Symphony Space, the Public Theater and the Lincoln Center Songbook series in New York, and on VH1’s Save the Music benefit.

An accomplished orchestrator and arranger, Andrew’s symphonic orchestrations of Broadway standards have been performed by the Boston Pops and over a dozen other US symphony orchestras. He created an evening of new arrangements and orchestrations for the Baltimore Symphonyʼs Gershwin Centennial celebration, in which he also appeared as piano soloist. His work as a musical director has taken him from off-Broadway houses to regional theaters, from Texas to Cape Cod, and from Russia to Taiwan. At 26, he was one of the youngest conductors ever to conduct a major international orchestra when he led the Seoul Philharmonic Symphonic in a series of sold-out concerts at the 3,000-seat Sejong Cultural Center. He has been a writer in residence at the Eugene O'Neill National Musical Theater Conference, and a Fellow at the MacDowell Artists’ Colony in New Hampshire and the Ucross Foundation in Wyoming.

Andrew’s play, Renovations, based on the memoir by the same title, will be premiered at the White Plains Performing Arts Center in March 2011, and his song cycle, Drink Well and Sing, based on ancient Greek love poetry, will be premiered by eminent American countertenor Lawrence Zazzo at London’s Wigmore Hall, also in March. His opera, The Beach (with librettist Royce Vavrek), will receive its premiere reading as part of New York City Opera’s VOX series in May. A CD of Andrew’s jazz arrangements of the songs of Maltby & Shire with vocalist Christa Justus was released in 2010 under the PS Classics Label. As an actor, Andrew appeared in the 2009 revival of Terrence McNally’s Master Class at the Paper Mill Playhouse in New Jersey starring Tony nominee Barbara Walsh, and has appeared in productions of Two Pianos, Four Hands. In 2010, he was heard as the “hands” of Coalhouse Walker Jr., in the Tony Award-winning revival of Ahrens & Flaherty’s RAGTIME at the Neil Simon Theater. He was musical director of the off-Broadway revival of "Closer Than Ever" and the cast album on Jay Records.
Andrew is the author of The Enraged Accompanist’s Guide to the Perfect Audition, which will be published this March by Hal Leonard (Applause Books). He teaches Musical Theater at Manhattan School of Music in New York. He is also on the faculty of Yale University, where he teaches musical theater songwriting.

References

Year of birth missing (living people)
Living people
21st-century American composers
Yale University alumni
American male pianists
American male composers
21st-century American pianists
21st-century American male musicians